Oskar David Ginsberger (2 February 18961 February 1979) was a Croatian physician (dermatovenerologist) and Partisan member during World War II.

Ginsberger was born in Gradište, in the Kingdom of Croatia-Slavonia on 2 February 1896 to a Jewish family. He finished grammar school in Gradište, and attended gymnasium in Vinkovci and Zagreb. In 1914 Ginsberger graduated from the Faculty of Medicine at the University of Graz. He completed dermatovenereology academic specialization in Vienna, 1922. Upon return to Osijek, he worked as a private physician. During World War II, in 1942, he joined the Partisans as a member of the VII. Banijska brigada (Banovina brigade). After the war he worked at the Sisak community health center. He worked on sexually transmitted diseases and their control. Ginsberger wrote articles which were published in local and western professional medical journals from 1925 to 1965. He translated the book of Jürgen Thorwald "Das Jahrhundert der Chirurgen" and Herbert Franks "Aufstand der Herzen". Ginsberger retired in 1953, but worked privately until 1965. He died in St. Gallen, Switzerland on 1 February 1979.

References

Bibliography 
 

1896 births
1979 deaths
People from Gradište, Croatia
People from the Kingdom of Croatia-Slavonia
Croatian Jews
Austro-Hungarian Jews
Croatian venereologists
University of Graz alumni
Jewish physicians
Jews in the Yugoslav Partisans
Yugoslav Partisans members
Croatian people of World War II
Croatian writers
Croatian translators
People from St. Gallen (city)
20th-century translators
Yugoslav physicians